The Revue des études slaves is a journal of Slavic studies that was established in 1921.

References 

Publications established in 1921
Slavic studies journals
Quarterly journals
French-language journals